Nejc is a Slovene masculine name, a diminutive of Jernej, Slovenian for Bartholomew. Notable people called Nejc include:

Nejc Barič (born 1997), Slovenian professional basketball player
Nejc Brodar (born 1982), Slovenian cross-country skier
Nejc Cehte (born 1992), Slovenian handball player
Nejc Dežman (born 1992), retired Slovenian ski jumper
Nejc Gazvoda (born 1985), Slovene writer, screenwriter and director
Nejc Kolman (born 1989), Slovenian professional football player
Nejc Križaj (born 1989), Slovenian football midfielder
Nejc Kuhar (born 1985), Slovenian ski mountaineer
Nejc Mevlja (born 1990), Slovenian footballer
Nejc Naraločnik (born 1999), alpine skier who competes for Slovenia
Nejc Pačnik (born 1990), Slovenian accordion world-champion and accordion teacher
Nejc Pečnik (born 1986), Slovenian professional footballer
Nejc Potokar (born 1988), retired Slovenian footballer
Nejc Praprotnik (born 1993), Slovenian footballer
Nejc Skubic (born 1989), retired Slovenian footballer
Nejc Vidmar (born 1989), Slovenian professional footballer
Nejc Žnidarčič (born 1984), Slovenian male canoeist

See also
Jernej
Bartholomew